Symphony No. 39 may refer to:

 Symphony No. 39 (Haydn)
 Symphony No. 39 (Michael Haydn)
 Symphony No. 39 (Mozart)

039